The Hudaydah Port is a key Yemeni port on the Red Sea coast. It is the second largest port in the country, located in Hudeidah, the fourth largest city in Yemen. The port handles up to 80% of the humanitarian supplies, fuel and commercial goods in northern Yemen.

Location 
The port is situated in the middle of Yemen's west coast on the red sea at 14.8411N, 42.9301E. The port was built between 1958 and 1961 with financial and technical assistance from the USSR.

Battle for the port 
In 2015 the Houthis took over the port of Hudeidah. Since then Saudi-led Coalition and the internationally recognized government of Yemen have repeatedly accused the Houthis of using the port to receive arms from Iran. In June 2018 the Saudi-led coalition launched an offensive led by UAE to retake the port from the Houthis.

See also 

 Yemen Red Sea Ports Corporation
 Yemen Gulf of Aden Ports Corporation
 Yemen Arabian Sea Ports Corporation
 Port of Aden

References 

Government of Yemen
Transport in Yemen
Red Sea
Al Hudaydah Governorate
1961 establishments in Yemen
Ports and harbours of Yemen